Williams Street Productions, LLC, d/b/a Williams Street and formerly known as Ghost Planet Industries, is an American animation and live action television production studio owned by the Warner Bros. Television Studios division of Warner Bros., a unit of Warner Bros. Discovery. The studio is the in-house production arm of Adult Swim (the programming block on Cartoon Network). Mike Lazzo and Keith Crofford oversaw operations for the building for most of its existence.

On December 16, 2019, co-founder Lazzo retired from the company, with business partner and co-founder Crofford retiring the following year. Michael Ouweleen was named president in 2020.

Name and logo 

The current name of the company originates from the location of its headquarters building – which is also the home office for Adult Swim – at 1065 Williams Street NW in Atlanta, Georgia near the current offices of TBS and TNT on Techwood Drive. The facility began as a carpet factory and was purchased by Turner as overflow offices for, among other things, set building and woodworking facilities, as well as CNN Field Engineering. Soon after CNN moved into the CNN Center in downtown Atlanta in the early 1980s, other Turner operations moved into the Techwood campus, an old country club which became the first headquarters for CNN. The street is named for early Atlanta settler Ammi Williams.

The company's original name, Ghost Planet Industries, came from Space Ghost's fictional planet, where the animated talk show Space Ghost Coast to Coast was purportedly filmed.

The studio's production logo features a wavy, blurred gray image of Space Ghost's fictional studio, with the words "Williams Street" beneath it. The soundtrack of Jack Webb's Mark VII Limited's production logo – a rumbling drum roll and two clinks of a hammer – is often used while the GPI/Williams Street production card is shown.

In its early years, the Williams Street logo would often be followed by the 1992–2004 Cartoon Network logo and the copyright byline against a black or white background. This was changed, in 2001, to a drawing of a skull and crossbones with the CN checkerboard logo for its teeth, accompanied by Matt Maiellaro yelling "SKULL!!!". On some programs, the yell is slowed down, on earlier episodes of Squidbillies, it is replaced with one of the actors on the show saying "Skull", as the skeleton of character Early Cuyler briefly flashes instead of the regular logo. The logo was created by Linda Simensky. In 2012, the inclusion of the Cartoon Network logo was removed and the copyright byline moved to beneath the Williams Street logo. In 2022, the copyright byline was removed from the Williams Street logo as a result of the Warner Bros. Discovery merger.

Filmography

TV animated series

TV live-action series

Internet series

Failed pilots

Specials

Stand-alones

TV series-related

Blocks

Feature films

Direct-to-video films

Future series in development

Other

Games 
 Aqua Teen Hunger Force Zombie Ninja Pro-Am (2007)
 Harvey Birdman: Attorney at Law (2008)

Music 

Williams Street formed their own music label, Williams Street Records. The label was created after Jason DeMarco, Adult Swim's vice president of strategic marketing and promotions, worked on Danger Doom, a project with Danger Mouse and MF Doom in 2005. Danger Mouse had previously worked on the music for Toonami and wanted to do an album that sampled that work. The group suggested the idea to Mike Lazzo; the project was successful. Williams Street Records now releases a majority of the music related to their shows. The label is managed by DeMarco.

Homages 
1065, the street number for Williams Street, is also the hull number for FishCenter Lives USS FishCenterprise (a parody of the original Star Treks USS Enterprise).

See also 

 List of programs broadcast by Adult Swim
 Adult animation
 Radical Axis
 Cartoon Network Studios
 List of animation studios owned by Warner Bros. Discovery

References 
Informational notes

Citations

External links 
 Adult Swim official website

 
1994 establishments in Georgia (U.S. state)
American companies established in 1994
Mass media companies established in 1994
Adult animation studios
American animation studios
Adult Swim
Cartoon Network
Companies based in Atlanta
Warner Bros. Discovery subsidiaries
Television production companies of the United States
Film production companies of the United States
Warner Bros. Television Studios
Warner Bros. divisions